Xanthostemon paradoxus, commonly known as bridal tree or northern penda, is a shrub or tree species in the family Myrtaceae that is endemic to Australia.

It blooms between March and September producing yellow coloured flowers. The stem is usually a cream or pale colour with brittle stripes usually visible in the outer blaze. The bark is grey and rough and flaky. 
The leaves are alternate and discolorous and glabrous throughout. The blades are narrowly to broadly elliptic in shape with an obtuse to attenuate base obtuse and an obtuse apex obtuse.

The calyx lobes triangular with ciliate margins. The petals are yellow with blades that are ovate to orbicular. Stamens are also yellow.

 
The tree has a lifespan from 11 to 20 years, and will produce seeds after 6 years of age. Following bushfires it is an epicormic resprouter.

It is found in along sandstone ridges an outcrops in the east Kimberley region of Western Australia between the Prince Regent National Park, Halls Creek and Kununurra extending into the Northern Territory from the border to central Arnhem Land and as far south as Timber Creek and as afar north as the Tiwi Islands. Usually found among the open forest or on rocky hillsides but sometimes found in or on the margins of monsoon forest.

The species was first formally described by the botanist Ferdinand von Mueller in 1857 as part of the work Nova genera et species aliquot rariores in Plagis Australiae Intratropicis nuperrime detecta. as published in Hooker's Journal of Botany and Kew Garden Miscellany. Other synonyms include Metrosideros paradoxus and Nania paradoxus.

In a woodland setting associated species include Erythrophleum chlorostachys, Eucalyptus foelscheana, Eucalyptus setosa, Eucalyptus confertiflora and Eucalyptus latifolia in the overstorey and Grevillea decurrens, Gardenia megasperma and Calytrix exstipulata in the sparsely vegetated understorey.

The plant is commonly cultivated from seedlings in and around Darwin area for as a shade tree in gardens and produces large bunches of yellow flowers which attract birds. It has a compact form and is quite drought tolerant.

References

paradoxus
Rosids of Western Australia
Plants described in 1857
Flora of the Northern Territory
Taxa named by Ferdinand von Mueller